Andrea Romitti (born August 16, 1919) was an Italian professional football player.

1919 births
Year of death missing
Italian footballers
Serie A players
Inter Milan players
Association football forwards
People from Suzzara
Sportspeople from the Province of Mantua
Footballers from Lombardy